Ghanem Nuseibeh (born May 11, 1977) is the founder of a strategy and management consultancy company, Cornerstone Global Associates. He was a member of the Club of Rome's think-tank 30 from 2004 to 2008.

He is a member of the Nuseibeh (alternatively spelled Nusseibeh) family of Jerusalem and lives in London.

Education 
Nuseibeh completed his school education at Dulwich College in London before moving to Imperial College, where he completed his undergraduate degree in Civil Engineering. He also completed his master's degree from the same university.

Nuseibeh was Senior Visiting Fellow at King's College London until 2012 and Edmond J. Safra Network Visiting Fellow at Harvard University Center for Ethics (2011-2013).

Career

Nuseibeh is a management consultant specialized in risk. After graduation, as a trained civil engineer, Nuseibeh designed major international infrastructure projects, including the Azerbaijan-Georgia-Turkey dual oil and gas pipeline, Durrat Al Bahrain man-made island, and Dubai Towers. Before founding his own company, Nuseibeh worked with WS Atkins and Mouchel Parkman.

In 2009, he founded the London-based strategy and management consultancy Cornerstone Global Associates. Cornerstone has offices around the world and advises private and government clients. It is regularly quoted in global media specifically on issues related to economic and political risk in the Middle East.

Non-profit 
Nuseibeh is active in interfaith work in the United Kingdom and a campaigner against extremism and against anti-Semitism.

Nuseibeh is a Trustee of the British Friends of Neve Shalom Wahat Al-Salam and Patron of British anti-extremism charity Faith Matters. He is Chairman of the UK's Muslims Against Anti Semitism.

In 1997, he contributed to the UK's Report of the Committee of Vice-Chancellors and Principals report on combatting extremism and violence on campus.

In July 2017, he was the only Muslim to speak at a rally in Parliament Square against Antisemitism in the British Labour Party The UK's Campaign Against AntiSemitism reported that he was cheered at the rally for saying "Do not hide behind pro-Arab, pro-Muslim or pro-Palestinian causes to justify your racism. We as Muslims do not need your support. We do not need the support of antisemites in the Labour Party."

In May 2019, he successfully campaigned to have Google Play store remove The Euro Fatwa App for promoting hate speech.

Controversies

In February 2019, a New York Times article suggested Nuseibeh was involved in campaign runs against the State of Qatar and FIFA 2022 World Cup. Cornerstone issued a statement denying the allegations in the New York Times article. Subsequently, on 6 March 2019, the New York Times published a correction on its website.

In November 2022, The Sunday Times reported that Ghanem Nuseibeh was a victim of a hacking campaign that targeted VIPs for his criticism of the Qatar World Cup. The newspaper also reported that associates of Nuseibeh were also victims of the hacking campaign.

Awards and recognition 
In 1996, he was awarded the Royal Academy of Engineering's Top Flight scholarship.

Nuseibeh is the 2005 winner of the British Geotechnical Association's Prediction competition and the 1st winner of the ALGS Papers Competition of the Institute of Civil Engineers in London.

Ghanem Nuseibeh is a Patron of the Executive Committee of the British Friends of Neve Shalom – Wāħat as-Salām, a village outside Jerusalem built to promote peace between Arabs and Jews in the Holy Land.

Publications 
Nuseibeh has written numerous publications including co-authoring two books with members of the Club of Rome's tt30, ICT for Education and Development: the challenges of meeting the Millennium Development Goals in Africa and Letters to the Future. He has also written articles for newspapers and magazines published around the world.

References

References and selected recent media quotes
The National newspaper report about Ghanem Nuseibeh 
Club of Rome's tt30 
Nuseibeh Family Website 
Times report about Dubai 
Sky News report about Dubai 
Reuters report about US-Iranian relations 
Budapest Sun report 

The Peninsula Qatar report

Publications

ICT for Education and Development - tt30 book 
Letters to the Future - tt30 book

External links
Personal website
Cornerstone Global Associates corporate website

1977 births
Activists against antisemitism
Living people
Ghanem
Futurologists
People from Dubai
Alumni of Imperial College London
People from Jerusalem